Moonnu Masangalku Mumbu is a 1986 Indian Malayalam film, directed by Cochin Haneefa and produced by Muhammed Mannil. The film stars Mammootty, Urvashi, Nedumudi Venu and Ambika in the lead roles. The film has a musical score by Shyam. It was remade in Tamil as Paasa Paravaigal and in Telugu as Anna Chellelu.

Cast
Mammootty as Dr. Rajasekharan
Urvashi as Adv. Raji Unnikrishnan
Nedumudi Venu as Dr. Unnikrishnan
Ambika as Adv. Nirmala Rajasekharan
Cochin Haneefa as Lorry driver
K. P. Ummer as Unnithan
Sukumari as Mrs. Menon
KPAC Sunny as Judge
Mala Aravindan as Ranjan
Ragini as Diana

Plot

Dr. Unnikrishnan (Nedumudi) is the son
of Unnithan,(Ummer) who is married to Adv. Raji. (Urvasi) Adv Raji is the brother of Dr. Rajasekharan. (Mammootty) Dr. Unni and Rajan were childhood friends. Dr. Unnikrishnan is killed in an accident and everyone including Adv. Raji suspects Dr Rajan as he was the one who might have benefitted by the death of Dr. Unni. Adv. Raji decides to fight against her brother, in the court, to avenge the death of her husband. Adv Nirmala (Ambika) who is the wife of Rajan appears for her husband in the court. On the eve of the final hearing in the court, Rajan discloses an important secret only known to him and Unni to Nirmala which can change the course of the trial.  Things take an unexpected turn in the court.

Soundtrack
The music was composed by Shyam and the lyrics were written by Poovachal Khader.

References

External links
 

1986 films
1980s Malayalam-language films
Malayalam films remade in other languages
Films directed by Cochin Haneefa